Hirini Matunga is a New Zealand town planning academic and as of 2019 is a full professor at the Lincoln University. He has written on Māori tourism as well as indigenous thinking within the field of urban planning.

Academic career

With a degree in town planning from the University of Auckland Matunga had 25 years experience as a town planner before joining Lincoln University as Director of the Centre for Maori and Indigenous Planning and Development.

Selected works 
 Matunga, Hirini. "Theorizing indigenous planning." Reclaiming indigenous planning (2013): 3–32.
 McIntosh*, Alison J., Frania Kanara Zygadlo, and Hirini Matunga. "Rethinking Maori tourism." Asia Pacific Journal of Tourism Research 9, no. 4 (2004): 331–352.
 Matunga, Hirini. "Decolonising planning: The Treaty of Waitangi, the environment and a dual planning tradition." Environmental planning and management in New Zealand (2000): 36–47.
 Dalziel, Paul, Hirini Matunga, and Caroline Saunders. "Cultural well-being and local government: Lessons from New Zealand." Australasian Journal of Regional Studies, The 12, no. 3 (2006): 267.
 Matunga, Hirini. "17 Waahi tapu: Maori sacred sites." Sacred sites, sacred places 23 (1994): 217.
 Zygadlo, F., Alison J. McIntosh, Hirini P. Matunga, John R. Fairweather, and David G. Simmons. "Maori tourism: concepts, characteristics and definition." (2003).

Personal life 
Matunga is Māori, of Kāti Māmoe, Ngāti Kahungunu, Ngāi Tahu and Rongowhakaata descent.

References

External links
 

Living people
Year of birth missing (living people)
Kāti Māmoe people
Ngāti Kahungunu people
Ngāi Tahu people
Rongowhakaata people
University of Auckland alumni
Academic staff of the Lincoln University (New Zealand)
New Zealand Māori academics
New Zealand urban planners